The 2020 United States House of Representatives elections in New Hampshire was held on November 3, 2020, to elect the two U.S. representatives from the state of New Hampshire, one from each of the state's two congressional districts. The elections coincided with the 2020 U.S. presidential election, as well as other elections to the House of Representatives, elections to the United States Senate and various state and local elections.

Overview

District 1

The 1st district is based in southeastern New Hampshire, and includes Greater Manchester, the Seacoast and the Lakes Region. The incumbent is Democrat Chris Pappas, who was elected with 53.6% of the vote in 2018.

Democratic primary

Candidates

Nominee
Chris Pappas, incumbent U.S. Representative

Endorsements

Primary results

Republican primary

Candidates

Nominee
Matt Mowers, former executive director of the New Hampshire Republican Party and former U.S. State Department staffer.

Eliminated in primary
Michael Callis
Jeff Denaro
Matt Mayberry, U.S. Air Force veteran and former Dover city councilor
Kevin Rondeau

Withdrawn
William Fowler, state representative (endorsed Mowers)

Declined
Eddie Edwards, former police chief of South Hampton, former chief of the New Hampshire State Division of Liquor Enforcement, and nominee for New Hampshire's 1st congressional district in 2018

Endorsements

Polling

Primary results

Libertarian primary

Candidates

Declared
Zachary Dumont, Newmarket town councilor

General election

Predictions

Polling

with Matt Mayberry

Generic Democrat vs Generic Republican

Results

District 2

The 2nd district encompasses western and northern New Hampshire, and includes the cities of Nashua and Concord. The incumbent is Democrat Ann McLane Kuster, who was re-elected with 55.3% of the vote in 2018.

Democratic primary

Candidates

Nominee
Annie Kuster, incumbent U.S. Representative

Eliminated in primary
Joseph Mirzoeff

Primary results

Republican primary

Candidates

Nominee
Steve Negron, former state representative and nominee for New Hampshire's 2nd congressional district in 2018

Eliminated in primary
Matthew Bjelobrk, Haverhill town selectman
Lynne Blankenbeker, former state representative and candidate for New Hampshire's 2nd congressional district in 2018
Eli Clemmer, school media specialist

Polling

Primary results

Endorsements

Libertarian primary

Candidates

Declared
Andrew Olding

General election

Predictions

Polling

with Lynne Blankenbeker

Generic Democrat vs Generic Republican

Results

See also
 2020 New Hampshire elections

Notes

References

External links
 
 
  (State affiliate of the U.S. League of Women Voters)
 

Official campaign websites for 1st district candidates
 Zachary Dumont (L) for Congress 
 Matt Mowers (R) for Congress
 Chris Pappas (D) for Congress

Official campaign websites for 2nd district candidates
 Ann McLane Kuster (D) for Congress
 Steve Negron (R) for Congress

2020
New Hampshire
United States House of Representatives